Bonobos was a Japanese band from Osaka that was formed in August 2001. Its final lineup consisted of Chunho Sai (guitar, vocals), Ryuhei Koike (lead guitar), Natsuko Morimoto (bass), Hirowatari Uemoto (drums) and Yuji Tanaka (keyboards). The band released its first full-length album Hover Hover in 2004.

In 2022 the band announced that it would disband one year later in spring 2023. The band officially disbanded in March 2023 after performing two farewell performances in Osaka and Tokyo.

Members

Current members
Chunho Sai lead vocals, guitar (2001–2023)
Natsuko Morimoto bass (2001–2023)
Ryuhei Koike  lead guitar (2015–2023)
Yuji Tanaka  keyboards (2015–2023)
Hirowatari Umemoto  drums (2015–2023)

Former Members
Yasuyuki "Kojiro" Sasaki  lead guitar (2001-2008)
Izumi Matsui percussion (2001-2010)
Bondo Tsuji  drums (2001-2015)

Discography

Albums
Hover Hover (2004)
Electlyric (2005)
あ，うん (a, un) (2006)
オリハルコン日和 (2009)
Ultra (2011)
Hyper Folk (2014)
23区 (2016)
.jp (2022)

Extended plays
Golden Days (2005)
FOLK CITY FOLK.ep (2017)

Compilations
PastramaThe Best of Bonobos (January 30, 2008)

Singles
"Mojiki Fuyu ga Kuru"
"Water"
"Ano Kotoba, Ano Hikari"
"Konnya-wa Groove Me"
"Thank You for the Music"
"Beautiful"
"Standing There ~Ima, Soko ni Ikuyo~"
"Arpeggio"

See also

2001 in music
List of dub artists
List of Japanese musicians

References

External links
bonobos.jp, the band's official website

2001 establishments in Japan
Musical groups from Osaka
Dub musical groups
Japanese rock music groups
Musical groups established in 2001
Musical quintets
Japanese reggae musical groups